Sidotheca is a genus of flowering plants belonging to the family Polygonaceae.

Its native range is California and Northwestern Mexico.

Species:

Sidotheca caryophylloides 
Sidotheca emarginata 
Sidotheca trilobata

References

Polygonaceae
Polygonaceae genera